Willard Theodore Schmidt (February 14, 1910 – April 13, 1965) was an American basketball player who competed in the 1936 Summer Olympics.

He was part of the American basketball team, which won the gold medal. He played one match.

He played college basketball at Creighton University.

External links
profile
USA Basketball All-Time Roster.

1910 births
1985 deaths
Amateur Athletic Union men's basketball players
Basketball players at the 1936 Summer Olympics
Basketball players from Nebraska
Creighton Bluejays men's basketball players
Medalists at the 1936 Summer Olympics
Olympic gold medalists for the United States in basketball
United States men's national basketball team players
American men's basketball players